Rattelsdorf may refer to:

 Rattelsdorf, city in Germany
 Rattelsdorf, Thuringia, town in Germany